Edmund Joseph Flaherty (March 8, 1897 – December 2, 1970) was an American film actor who appeared in about 200 films.

Biography

Early life
Flaherty was born Edmund Joseph Flaherty in Washington, D.C.; the son of Mary Rose Ella (née Wilson) and Michael Joseph Flaherty.  He was the older brother of writer Vincent X. Flaherty. Flaherty had Irish ancestry. Pat attended Eastern High School, and Dean College in Franklin, Massachusetts.  After playing baseball, he attended Princeton University and graduated on January 26, 1918.  Flaherty served in the United States Army during the Pancho Villa Expedition and then as a pilot in World War I.

Early athletic career
Flaherty was a popular Washington, D.C. athlete and coach, who went on to become a professional baseball and football player who pitched for John McGraw's New York Giants, and punted for George Halas' Chicago Bears. After his professional athletic career ended, he went into the music publishing business with the legendary DeSylva, Brown and Henderson during the time of Mayor Jimmy Walker in New York.

Acting career
Flaherty relocated to Hollywood to take a position as a producer at 20th Century Fox for the owner Joseph P. Kennedy when the Great Depression began. Subsequently, he found work as an actor and technical advisor in over 200 motion pictures. Flaherty can be seen in roles both large and small in films such as Death on the Diamond (1934), Mutiny on the Bounty (1935), Sergeant York (1941), Yankee Doodle Dandy (1942), The Pride of the Yankees (1942), It Happened in Flatbush (1942), and a bit appearance as a bewildered Marine in Stage Door Canteen.

In 1943 he was commissioned in the US Marine Corps as a captain. He returned to the Corps for the Korean War and finished his service as a major.

He resumed his acting career after the war with The Stratton Story (1949, as the Western All-Stars coach), The Jackie Robinson Story (1950) and The Winning Team (1952, as legendary umpire Bill Klem). He was given the task of making William Bendix look, move and act like Babe Ruth in The Babe Ruth Story, and Gary Cooper to pitch, look, move and act like Lou Gehrig in Pride of the Yankees. Outside the realm of baseball, Flaherty was usually cast in blunt, muscle-bound roles, notably Fredric March's taciturn male nurse "Cuddles" in A Star is Born (1937). One of Flaherty's most unusual roles was in Wheeler & Woolsey's Off Again, On Again (1937), in which his character finds his wife (played by actress Patricia Wilder) in a compromising position with Bert Wheeler; he does not pummel the hapless Wheeler as expected, but instead meekly apologizes for his wife's flirtatiousness.

Personal life
Pat Flaherty was married twice. His first wife was the former Dorothy Fiske. The couple had one child, Edmund Flaherty, Jr. who was born in 1919 and died in 1995, by which time his name had been changed to Edmund Graham. On January 19, 1929, Flaherty married Dorothea Xaviera Fugazy, the daughter of boxing promoter Jack Fugazy aka Humbert Fugazy. They had two children, Patrick Joseph Flaherty and Frances X. Flaherty Knox.

Flaherty died on December 4, 1970, in New York City of a heart attack.

Selected filmography

References

External links
 
 Pat Flaherty – CITWF

1897 births
1970 deaths
20th-century American male actors
American World War I pilots
American aviators
American male film actors
American male television actors
American people of Irish descent
Male actors from New York City
Male actors from Washington, D.C.
Princeton University alumni
United States Army personnel of World War I
United States Marine Corps officers
United States Marine Corps personnel of World War II
United States Marine Corps personnel of the Korean War
 Eastern High School (Washington, D.C.) alumni